Implicit Obedience is the debut album by the technical death metal band Desecravity. It was mixed and mastered at Mana Recording Studios by Erik Rutan (Hate Eternal) in June 2011 and was released on January 24 of 2010 on Willowtip Records.

Track listing

Credits
 Yuichi Kudo - Drums
 Yujiro Suzuki - Vocals/Guitar
 Keisuke Takagi - Guitar
 Toshihiro Inagaki - Bass

2012 debut albums
Desecravity albums